Horacio Zeballos was the defending champion, but lost in the first round to Agustín Velotti.

Souza won the title, defeating Alejandro González in the final, 6–4, 6–4.

Seeds

Draw

Finals

Top half

Bottom half

References
 Main Draw
 Qualifying Draw

Aberto de São Paulo - Singles
2014 Singles
2014 in Brazilian tennis